, alternate title: Kingorō no kodakara sōdō (金語楼の子宝騒動), is a 1949 black and white Japanese film directed by Torajiro Saito.

Cast 
 Kingorou Yanagiya (柳家金語楼)
 Achako Hanabishi (花菱アチャコ)
 (月丘千秋)
 (久我美子)
 (堀雄二)
 (江戸川蘭子)
 Hibari Misora (美空ひばり)
 (田中春男)
 Shintarō Kido (木戸新太郎 / キドシン)
 (飯田蝶子)
 (浦辺粂子)
 Nijiko Kiyokawa (清川虹子)

See also
 List of films in the public domain in the United States

References 

Japanese black-and-white films
1949 films
Films directed by Torajiro Saito